Michael W. Reilly Jr. (born January 30, 1973) is a member of the New York State Assembly, representing the 62nd district since 2019.  He is a Republican. The district includes portions of the South shore of Staten Island.  Reilly formerly served in the United States Army Reserve and was an officer with the New York City Police Department. He previously served as well as the president of the Community Education Council (CEC) for District 31, which includes all of Staten Island. He has a BS in Legal Studies from John Jay College. He resides in Eltingville with his wife and family.

In 2018 Assemblyman Ronald Castorina opted to not seek re-election in order to run for a judgeship. Reilly, in a three way primary, easily defeated his two opponents to claim the Republican nomination. He won the general election with nearly 90% of the vote.

School Safety: While president of the CEC, Reilly focused on the issue of school safety. As Assemblyman, he has continued his push to see front doors of academic buildings locked and for retired police officers to serve as supplemental school security.

Secession: Discussion surrounding the Staten Island Secession received renewed attention in 2019. Reilly announced his support for the Divide NY plan, indicating his desire to see Staten Island become part of the upstate New York region - New Amsterdam.

Reilly received the endorsement  of the Staten Island Republican Party’s Executive Committee for his 2020 re-election bid. In November 2020, he won re-election unopposed.

References

External links 

 Michael Reilly - New York State Assembly (official site)

Living people
Republican Party members of the New York State Assembly
21st-century American politicians
1973 births
John Jay College of Criminal Justice alumni
Politicians from Staten Island
People from Eltingville, Staten Island